I'm Gonna Love Her on the Radio is the thirty-sixth studio album by American country music artist Charley Pride. It was released in March 1988 via 16th Avenue Records. The album includes the singles "Shouldn't It Be Easier Than This", "I'm Gonna Love Her on the Radio" and Where Was I.

Track listing

Chart performance

References

1988 albums
Charley Pride albums
16th Avenue Records albums